Donald Romain Davis (born February 4, 1957) is an American composer, conductor, orchestrator and trombonist known for his film and television scores. He has also composed opera, concert and chamber music.

Davis has collaborated with well-known directors including The Wachowskis, Ronny Yu, and Joe Johnston in genres ranging from horror, to action, to comedy. His best known works include music for The Matrix franchise, and the television series Beauty and the Beast and seaQuest 2032.

Davis has been nominated for eight Primetime Emmy Awards, winning twice for Outstanding Music Composition for a Series. He has also won four BMI Film Music Awards.

Early life and education
Davis was born in Anaheim, California. He began playing trumpet and piano at the age of nine, and started writing music at twelve. As his affinity for music grew, so did his aspirations, and soon he was composing and arranging orchestral charts for local jazz ensembles that he also performed with.

After graduating from high school, Davis enrolled at UCLA. He continued his study of musical composition with tutor Henri Lazarof. Additionally, he learned orchestration from Albert Harris.

Career
During their orchestration lessons, Harris introduced Davis to the TV composer Joe Harnell, who supported Davis during his search for work—his first job was working for composer Mark Snow's TV show Hart to Hart. He has worked as an orchestrator and conductor for Michael Kamen, Alan Silvestri, James Horner, and Randy Newman.

Davis was nominated for the Emmys in 1990 for Beauty and the Beast and won in 1995 for SeaQuest DSV. He wrote scores mostly for television series up until 1995, in which he wrote a few of the cues for the animated Disney motion picture A Goofy Movie. He continued to score television series until the two then young directors, the Wachowskis, hired him to score their neo-noir film Bound. It was reasonably successful at the box office. Bound was the film which led Davis into becoming the composer for the entire Matrix trilogy. Subsequently, Davis has composed scores for films such as Universal Soldier: The Return, Jurassic Park III (recommended to the filmmakers by John Williams, the composer of the scores for the first two films in the series), House on Haunted Hill, Behind Enemy Lines, and The Unsaid. In 2004, he produced the music score for the BBC science fiction documentary series Space Odyssey: Voyage to the Planets, released as Voyage to the Planets and Beyond in the United States.

Davis' magnum opus is the Matrix franchise: The Matrix, The Matrix Reloaded, The Matrix Revolutions, and The Animatrix. It was set apart from other film scores of its time for its atonality and avant garde style of composition, with influences from polytonal minimalist works by John Adams and cluster-like as well as aleatoric techniques prominent in the works of composer Witold Lutosławski.

In addition to orchestrating and conducting his own scores, Don Davis has done orchestration work for many other composers. He was the conductor for the movie Flowers in the Attic, whose score was composed by Christopher Young, and for the TV documentary Eagles: Hell Freezes Over. He arranged music for The 86th Academy Awards as well. He is also regular orchestrator for Randy Newman.

Don Davis' political opera, Río de Sangre, premiered at the Florentine Opera Company on October 22, 2010. Excerpts of the opera had previously been performed in Los Angeles with the Los Angeles Master Chorale on November 6, 2005, and the New York City Opera on May 13, 2007.

Personal life
Davis currently splits his time between Southern California and British Columbia, Canada. He has been married to Megan MacDonald since 1986, and they have two children together.

Filmography

Film

Orchestration work

Television

Television films and limited series

Other works 

 Chronym I for flute (1977)
 Trio for violin, viola & cello (1978)
 12 Poems For Jonathan David Wolf for soprano & piano (1978)
 Chamber Concerto (1978)
 Timbral Spectra (1979)
 Chamber Variations (1979)
 Chronym II (1980)
 Chamber Symphony (1981)
 Chronym III (1981)
 Symphony (1982)
 Bleeding Particles (1983)
 Harsh (1988)
 Bleak (1989)
 The Eye And The Pyramid (1990)
 Going On (1991)
 Green Light (1992)
 What Is The Silence (1993)
 Afterimages (1994)
 Of The Illuminated (1995)
 Flurry (1996)
 No Exit (1996)
 The Enchanted Place Suite (1997)
 Pain (1998)
 Illicit Felicity (1999) - Excerpt from “Bound” score
 Critical Mass (2000)
 Wandering (2002)
 A Lunatic Air (On Fire) (2002)
 Río de Sangre (2005) - Opera in three acts

References

External links
 
 
 Río De Sangre

1957 births
20th-century American LGBT people
21st-century American LGBT people
American classical composers
American classical trombonists
American conductors (music)
American contemporary classical composers
American film score composers
American LGBT musicians
American male classical composers
American male conductors (music)
American male film score composers
American opera composers
American television composers
Classical musicians from California
Composers for trombone
Concert band composers
LGBT classical composers
LGBT film score composers
Living people
Male opera composers
Male television composers
Male trombonists
Musicians from Anaheim, California
University of California, Los Angeles alumni
Varèse Sarabande Records artists